Nicolás Exequiel Torres  (born 9 September 1997 in La Rioja, Argentina) is an Argentine BMX (bicycle motocross) cyclist.

He took part in the 2014 Summer Youth Olympics BMX event in Nanjing, China. He was the 2015 UCI BMX World Championships Junior World Champion. Torres was selected in the Argentinian team for the Cycling at the 2020 Summer Olympics – Men's BMX racing.

References

External links
 
 
 
 
 

1997 births
Living people
BMX riders
Argentine male cyclists
Olympic cyclists of Argentina
Cyclists at the 2014 Summer Youth Olympics
Cyclists at the 2020 Summer Olympics
Sportspeople from La Rioja Province, Argentina
21st-century Argentine people